Gaocheng is a town in Dengfeng, Henan province, China. , it has 30 villages under its administration.
Gaocheng Village
Quhe Village
Shuangmiao Village
Beigou Village
Zhuyuan Village
Wudu Village
Jiagou Village
Chatinggou Village
Bafang Village
Senzigou Village
Fandian Village
Jietou Village
Wang Village
Yanggou Village
Baogou Village
Weiyuangou Village
Yeshang Village
Wangyao Village
Shuiyu Village
Wangjiamen Village
Miaozhuang Village
Tianjiagou Village
Shiyangguan Village
Jiangzhuang Village
Nanyanzhuang Village
Lüzhuang Village
Gaojietou Village
Yuanyao Village
Beiyanzhuang Village
Wujia Village

See also 
 List of township-level divisions of Henan
 Yangcheng (historical city)

References 

Township-level divisions of Henan
Dengfeng